Lottery Scratchcards is a 2003 novel by Swedish author Kerstin Ekman. It won the August Prize in 2003.

References

2003 Swedish novels
Swedish-language novels
August Prize-winning works